David Keith McCurdy (born March 30, 1950) is an American lobbyist, lawyer, and former politician who was the Democratic U.S. Representative from Oklahoma's 4th congressional district, in office from 1981 to 1995. Described as a moderate or conservative Democrat, McCurdy was a chair the centrist Democratic Leadership Council. In 1994, he ran for the U.S. Senate, but lost to fellow Representative Jim Inhofe.

After leaving Congress, McCurdy became a lobbyist. He is a former president of the American Gas Association.

Early life and education
McCurdy was born in the town of Canadian, Texas. He received an undergraduate degree from the University of Oklahoma in 1972 and a JD there three years later. He studied international economics at Scotland's University of Edinburgh as a Rotary International Graduate Fellow.

Military service and entry into politics
McCurdy served in the United States Air Force Reserve, attaining the rank of major and serving as a Judge Advocate General (JAG). He was an Assistant Attorney General for the State of Oklahoma from 1975-77.

Congressional career

Congressional campaigns
McCurdy served for seven terms, from 1981-95. In 1980 he ran for Oklahoma's 4th congressional district seat in Congress, succeeding sixteen-term congressman Tom Steed from Shawnee. He trailed Oklahoma House Majority Leader James B. Townsend, also from Shawnee, in the Democratic primary 40% to 34%, then won 51.2% of the vote in the runoff election. McCurdy defeated Townsend with campaign commercials espousing prayer in public and support for a statue of Jesus  Christ in the Wichita mountains, near Lawton.

He defeated Republican Howard Rutledge 74,245 to 71,339 in the general election, and again in 1982 by a vote of 84,205 to 44,351. He won a third term in 1984 by defeating Jerry Smith 109,447 to 60,844, with Libertarian Gordon Mobley picking up 1% of the vote. After winning 81.9% of the Democratic primary vote in 1986, McCurdy coasted to a fourth term with 94,984 votes (76.1%) over Republican Larry Humphreys. McCurdy had no Republican opponent in 1988, and won in 1990 with 73.6% of the vote in the general election. In 1992 he received 70.7% of the final tally.

Leadership positions

Specializing in national security and intelligence issues, McCurdy was appointed to leadership positions in the field including chairmanships of the House Intelligence Committee, Military Installations and Facilities Subcommittee of the House Armed Services Committee and the Transportation Aviation and Materials Subcommittee of the Science and Space Committee.

Other work in Congress
McCurdy founded and chaired a group of moderate and conservative House Democrats called the Mainstreet Forum. At its height in 1994, it counted seventy-two members.

In Congress, McCurdy played a major role in the following pieces of legislation: the 1988 National Superconductivity Competitiveness Act, the 1985 Goldwater-Nichols Act, which re-organized the U.S. Department of Defense, the Nunn-McCurdy Amendment of 1982, requiring congressional notification of Defense cost overruns of 15% or more, and the 1993 National Service Legislation, which originated in a bill introduced by Congressman McCurdy and former Georgia Senator Sam Nunn.

DLC co-founder and 1992 presidential election
In the 1990s, McCurdy was a national chairman of the Democratic Leadership Council, a group that sought to moderate the Democratic Party. McCurdy was seen as a "rising national star." According to George Stephanopoulos in his political memoir, All Too Human, McCurdy at one point considered his own presidential campaign in 1992, although he eventually supported fellow DLC member Bill Clinton, and delivered a speech seconding his nomination at the Democratic Party National Convention. During the speech, "'McCurdy 2000' signs could be seen in the crowd."

Following Clinton's election, McCurdy was considered for United States Secretary of Defense, a job which ultimately went to Les Aspin. McCurdy was offered the role of Director of Central Intelligence, but turned it down.

1994 run for the U.S. Senate
In 1994, when U.S. Senator David L. Boren decided to leave the U.S. Senate before the expiration of his term, McCurdy decided not to seek re-election to the House of Representatives; instead, he ran for the Senate. He campaigned on military preparedness and family values. He lost the general election to fellow congressman Jim Inhofe, whose campaign ads played clips of McCurdy's speech seconding Clinton's nomination for president. McCurdy took only 39 percent of the vote, and even lost his own congressional district. He sent his congressional records and papers to the Carl Albert Center for Congressional Studies at the University of Oklahoma.

Career after Congress
McCurdy was chairman and chief executive officer of the McCurdy Group LLC. In 1998 he was elected President of the Electronic Industries Alliance (EIA) a national trade organization representing the electronics industry, even though House Majority Leader Tom DeLay held up legislation of benefit to the EIA and threatened it with a loss of access if it did not hire a Republican instead. DeLay was later rebuked by the House Ethics Committee.

He is chairman of the Center for Strategic and Budgetary Assessments and has served on the Defense Policy Board under presidents George W. Bush and Barack Obama.

On February 12, 2007, McCurdy became president of the Alliance of Automobile Manufacturers (AAM). Under McCurdy's leadership, AAM supported Obama's National Program to reduce carbon emissions and increase fuel economy standards and a federal ban on texting while driving.

In February 2011, McCurdy became president and CEO of the American Gas Association. In August 2011, McCurdy began service as a member of the Board of Directors of LMI, a not-for-profit studies and analysis consulting firm headquartered in McLean, Virginia.  He also serves on the board of directors of the Committee for a Responsible Federal Budget.

Personal
McCurdy lives with his wife, Dr. Pam McCurdy in McLean, Virginia; the couple has three children.

References

External links
 McCurdy official bio at Auto Alliance
Dave McCurdy Collection and Photograph Series at the Carl Albert Center
 

|-

|-

|-

|-

1950 births
20th-century American lawyers
20th-century American politicians
American Lutherans
American lobbyists
Candidates in the 1994 United States elections
Center for Strategic and Budgetary Assessments
Democratic Party members of the United States House of Representatives from Oklahoma
Living people
Military personnel from Texas
Oklahoma lawyers
People from Hemphill County, Texas
United States Air Force officers
University of Oklahoma alumni
United States Air Force Judge Advocate General's Corps
Members of Congress who became lobbyists